Harutaeographa brahma is a moth of the family Noctuidae. It is found in Nepal (Ganesh Himal).

References

Moths described in 1998
Orthosiini